The AT&T DSP1 was a pioneering digital signal processor (DSP) created by Bell Labs.

The DSP1 started in 1977 with a Bell Labs study that recommended creating a large-scale integrated circuit for digital signal processing. It described a basic DSP architecture with multiplier/accumulator, addressing unit, and control; the I/O, data, and control memories were planned to be off-chip until large-scale integration could make a single chip implementation feasible. 

The DSP1 specification was completed in 1978, with first samples tested in May 1979. This first implementation was a single-chip DSP, containing all functional elements found in today's DSPs including multiplier–accumulator (MAC), parallel addressing unit, control, control memory, data memory, and I/O. It was designed with a 20-bit fixed point data format, and 16-bit coefficients and instructions, implemented in a  DRAM process technology. 

By October 1979 other Bell Labs groups began development using the DSP1, most notably as a key component in AT&T's 5ESS switch.

References

 Stanzione et al., "Final Report Study Group on Digital Integrated Signal Processors," Bell Labs Internal Memorandum, October 1977.
 Boddie, Daryanani, Eldumtan, Gadenz, Thompson, Walters, Pedersen, "A Digital Signal Processor for Telecommunications Applications," ISSCC Digest of Technical Papers, February 1980, p. 44.
 Chapman, R. C. ed., "Digital Signal Processor," The Bell System Technical Journal, Special Edition, Vol. 60, No. 7, Part 2 (September 1981) pp. 1431–1701.
 Computer History Museum description
 "The Legacy of DSP1", Electronic News, Nov 8, 1999

AT&T computers
Bell Labs
Digital signal processors